Spinning count is a measure of fibre fineness and distribution developed by the English. It is defined as the number of hanks of yarn that can be spun from a pound of wool. A hank of wool is 560 yards long (560 yd/lb = 1.129 km/kg). In theory a pound of 62s wool could produce 34720 yards of yarn.

As it is now a relatively simple matter to measure the average fibre diameter and distribution, spinning count is being replaced with the specification of average fibre diameter in micrometers and fiber distribution in standard deviations.

See also
 S number (wool)
 Wool measurement

References

Spinning
Imperial units
Customary units of measurement in the United States